Patricia Louise Holte (born May 24, 1944), known professionally as Patti LaBelle, is an American R&B singer, songwriter, actress and businesswoman. 
LaBelle is referred to as the "Godmother of Soul".

She began her career in the early 1960s as lead singer and frontwoman of the vocal group Patti LaBelle and the Bluebelles. Following the group's name change to Labelle in the 1970s, they released the popular number-one hit "Lady Marmalade". As a result, after the group split in 1976, LaBelle began a successful solo career, starting with her critically acclaimed debut album, which included the career-defining song, "You Are My Friend". LaBelle became a mainstream solo star in 1984 following the success of the singles "If Only You Knew", "Love, Need and Want You" (later sampled for 2002's "Dilemma"), "New Attitude" and "Stir It Up". Less than two years later, in 1986, LaBelle scored a number-one album Winner in You and its number-one duet single, "On My Own", with Michael McDonald. 

In 1989, Be Yourself spawned the standard "If You Asked Me To" (later covered by Celine Dion). LaBelle won a 1992 Grammy for Best Female R&B Vocal Performance for her 1991 album Burnin', an album that featured "Somebody Loves You Baby (You Know Who It Is)", "Feels Like Another One", and "When You've Been Blessed (Feels Like Heaven)". LaBelle earned a second Grammy win for the live album Live! One Night Only. Her 1990s albums Burnin, Gems (1994) and Flame (1997) continued her popularity with young R&B audiences throughout the decade. She reunited with her Labelle bandmates for the album Back to Now, followed by a well-received promotional tour. 

LaBelle has also experienced success as an actress with a role in the Oscar-nominated film A Soldier's Story, and in TV shows such as A Different World and American Horror Story: Freak Show. In 1992, LaBelle starred in her own TV sitcom Out All Night. A decade later, LaBelle hosted her own lifestyle TV show, Living It Up with Patti LaBelle on TV One. In 2015, LaBelle took part in the dance competition Dancing with the Stars at the age of 70. Labelle has also seen success launching her own brand of bedding, cookbooks, and food for various companies. In 2015 her Patti's Sweet Potato Pie sold millions when a YouTube video praising the product went viral. As a result, over a 72-hour period, Walmart sold one pie every second.

In a career that has spanned seven decades, she has sold more than 50 million records worldwide. LaBelle has been inducted into the Grammy Hall of Fame, the Hollywood Walk of Fame, the Black Music & Entertainment Walk of Fame, and the Apollo Theater Hall of Fame. LaBelle was included in Rolling Stone on their list of 100 Greatest Singers. LaBelle is a dramatic soprano recognized for her vocal power, range and emotive delivery.

 Early life and career 
 Patti LaBelle and the Bluebelles 
LaBelle was born Patricia Louise Holte in the Eastwick section of Southwest Philadelphia, Pennsylvania. She was born the second youngest child of Henry (1919–1989) and Bertha (Robinson; 1916–1978) Holte's three children, and the next-to-youngest of five children overall. Her siblings were Thomas Hogan Jr. (1930-2013), Vivian Hogan (1932–1975), Barbara (1942–1982) and Jacqueline "Jackie" (1945–1989). Her father was a railroad worker and club performer and her mother was a domestic. Despite enjoying her childhood, LaBelle would later write in her memoirs, Don't Block the Blessings, that her parents' marriage was abusive. Shortly after her parents' divorce, when LaBelle was twelve, she was sexually molested by a family friend.

She joined a local church choir at the Beulah Baptist Church at ten and performed her first solo two years later. While she was growing up, she listened to secular music styles such as R&B and jazz music as well.

When she was sixteen, LaBelle won a talent competition at her high school, John Bartram High School. This success led to her first singing group, the Ordettes, in 1960, with schoolmates Jean Brown, Yvonne Hogen and Johnnie Dawson. With LaBelle as front woman, the group became a local attraction until two of its members left to marry, while another was forced to quit the group by her religious father. In 1962, the Ordettes included three new members, Cindy Birdsong, Sarah Dash and Nona Hendryx, the latter two girls having sung for another now defunct vocal group. That year, they auditioned for local record label owner Harold Robinson. Robinson agreed to work with the group after hearing LaBelle sing the song "I Sold My Heart to the Junkman". Initially, Robinson was dismissive of LaBelle, believing her to be "too dark and too plain".

Shortly after Robinson signed them, he had them record as the Blue Belles and they were selected to promote the recording of "I Sold My Heart to the Junkman", which had been recorded by The Starlets. It was recorded as a Blue Belles single due to label conflict. The Starlets' manager sued Harold Robinson after the Blue Belles were seen performing a lip-synching version of the song on American Bandstand. After settling out of court, Robinson altered the group's name to "Patti LaBelle and The Blue Belles". Robinson gave Holte the name "LaBelle", which meant "the beautiful" in French. Initially, a Billboard ad cited the group as "Patti Bell and the Blue Bells". In 1963, the group scored their first hit single with the ballad "Down the Aisle" which became a crossover top 40 hit on the Billboard pop and R&B charts after King Records issued it. Later in the year, they recorded their rendition of the "You'll Never Walk Alone"; the single was later re-released on Cameo-Parkway Records where the group scored a second hit on the pop charts with the song in 1964. Another charted single, "Danny Boy", was released that same year. In 1965, after Cameo-Parkway folded, the group moved to New York and signed with Atlantic Records where they recorded twelve singles for the label, including the mildly charted singles "All or Nothing" and "Take Me for a Little While". The group's Atlantic tenure included their rendition of "Over the Rainbow" and a version of the song "Groovy Kind of Love". In 1967, Birdsong left the group to join The Supremes and by 1970 the group had been dropped from Atlantic Records as well as by their longtime manager Bernard Montague.

That year, Vicki Wickham, producer of the UK music show Ready, Steady, Go, agreed to manage the group after Dusty Springfield mentioned signing them. Wickham's first direction for the group was for them to change their name to simply Labelle and advised the group to renew their act, going for a more homegrown look and sound that reflected funk, rock and psychedelic soul. In 1971, the group opened for the Who in several stops on the group's U.S. tour.

 Labelle 

Labelle signed with Warner Bros. Records and released their self-titled debut album in 1971. The record's psychedelic soul sound and its blending of rock, funk, soul and gospel rhythms was a departure from the group's early girl-group sound. That same year, they sang background vocals on Laura Nyro's album, Gonna Take a Miracle. A year later, in 1972, the group released Moon Shadow, which repeated the homegrown gritty sound of the previous album. In 1973, influenced by glam rockers David Bowie and Elton John, Wickham had the group dressed in silver space suits and luminescent makeup.

After their third successive album, Pressure Cookin', failed to generate a hit, Labelle signed with Epic Records in 1974, releasing their most successful album to date, with Nightbirds, which blended soul, funk, glam and rock music, thanks to the work of the album's producer, Allen Toussaint. The proto-disco single, "Lady Marmalade", would become their biggest-selling single, going number one on the Billboard Hot 100 and selling over a million copies, as did Nightbirds, which later earned a RIAA gold award, for sales of a million units, which was later inducted into the Grammy Hall of Fame. In October 1974, Labelle made pop history by becoming the first rock and roll vocal group to perform at the Metropolitan Opera House. Riding high on the success of "Lady Marmalade" and the Nightbirds album, Labelle made the cover of Rolling Stone in 1975.

Labelle released two more albums, Phoenix and Chameleon in 1975 and 1976, respectively. While both albums continued the group's critical success, none of the singles issued on those albums ever crossed over to the pop charts. By 1976, Patti, Nona and Sarah began arguing over the group's musical direction. Personal difficulties came to a head during a show on December 16, 1976, in Baltimore, Maryland, where Hendryx went backstage and injured herself during a nervous breakdown. Following the incident, LaBelle advised that the group separate.

 Solo career 
 Early solo career (1977–1984) 
Signing a solo contract with Epic Records in 1977, LaBelle recruited David Rubinson, producer of Chameleon, to record her self-titled debut album, which was released that year. The album was noted for the disco hits, "Joy to Have Your Love" and "Dan Swit Me" and the gospel ballad, "You Are My Friend", the latter song becoming her first career-defining single despite its low entry on the R&B chart. Three more albums were released in succession on Epic through 1980, with the songs "Eyes in the Back of My Head", "Little Girls", "Music is My Way of Life", "Come What May", "Release (The Tension)" and "I Don't Go Shopping" (the latter song co-written by Peter Allen) being the most successful.

After four albums on Epic, LaBelle signed with Philadelphia International Records where she recorded a notable version of "Over the Rainbow" on the album The Spirit's in It. In 1982, she was featured on the Grover Washington duet "The Best Is Yet to Come", and earned accolades that year for starring in the Broadway musical Your Arms Too Short to Box with God. "The Best Is Yet to Come" later earned LaBelle her first Grammy Award nomination. In 1983, LaBelle released her breakthrough album I'm in Love Again which included her first top ten R&B singles, with "Love, Need and Want You" and "If Only You Knew", the latter song also becoming her first number-one single as a solo artist in early 1984. Later in 1984, she scored another hit with Bobby Womack on the song "Love Has Finally Come at Last" and appeared as a club singer in the film A Soldier's Story.

 Crossover success (1984–2009) 

In 1984, LaBelle recorded the songs "New Attitude" and "Stir It Up" for the soundtrack to the Eddie Murphy film, Beverly Hills Cop. Following the release of the film, "New Attitude" was released as a single in late 1984 and became LaBelle's first crossover solo hit, reaching number 17 on the Billboard Hot 100 and becoming a signature song. "Stir It Up" found similar success on pop radio and as a staple in dance clubs. In 1985, LaBelle performed on the TV special, Motown Returns to Apollo and also as part of the all-star benefit concert, Live Aid. LaBelle's notoriety from performing on these two specials made her a pop star and led to having her own television special later that same year. Also in the same year, a video of a performance from her tour of that year was issued on VHS. During this period, LaBelle ended her contractual obligations to Philadelphia International and signed with MCA Records.

LaBelle shared a stage with Gladys Knight and Dionne Warwick for the 1986 HBO special Sisters in the Name of Love.  During the same year LaBelle released her best-selling solo album Winner in You, which reached number one on the pop charts. The album included the international number-one hit, "On My Own" and the hit ballad "Oh People". The success of Winner in You would prove to be the peak of her solo success, though she continued her acclaim with the 1989 release of Be Yourself, which featured "Yo Mister" and the hit ballad "If You Asked Me To", which found bigger success in a remake by singer Celine Dion. In the year of that album's release, LaBelle began a successful stint in a recurring role on A Different World, the success of which spawned a brief sitcom of her own, titled Out All Night, which only lasted a season. In 1991, she recorded a hit duet version of the Babyface composition, "Superwoman" with Gladys Knight and Dionne Warwick. In the same year, LaBelle released the solo album, Burnin', which went gold, with three successive top five singles on the R&B charts. This success led to LaBelle winning her first Grammy Award in the Best Female R&B Vocal Performance category in the 34th Annual Grammy Award Ceremony of 1992, sharing the win with singer Lisa Fischer, who won for her hit ballad, "How Can I Ease the Pain", in a rare tie in the history of the Grammys. She was also nominated in the Best R&B Performance by a Duo or Group with Vocal category alongside Knight and Warwick for "Superwoman."

LaBelle's 1994 album, Gems, also went gold and featured the hit, "The Right Kinda Lover". On January 29, 1995, LaBelle performed at the Super Bowl XXIX halftime show, held at the Joe Robbie Stadium (which later became Hard Rock Stadium) in Miami, Florida with Tony Bennett, Arturo Sandoval and Miami Sound Machine. LaBelle released the album, Flame, which included the dance hit, "When You Talk About Love". LaBelle released her best-selling memoirs, Don't Block the Blessings, in 1996, and released the first of five best-selling cookbooks in 1997. In 1998, she released the live album, Live! One Night Only, later resulting in a second Grammy win the following February. It remains her most recent Grammy win. In 2000, LaBelle released her final MCA album, When a Woman Loves, before signing with Def Soul Classics to release the 2004 album, Timeless Journey. During the promotional run of the album, she headlined VH1 Divas for the first time, alongside artists like Debbie Harry and Jessica Simpson and good friends Knight and Cyndi Lauper. Following the release of her 2005 covers album, Classic Moments, LaBelle engaged in a rivalry with Antonio "L.A." Reid over the direction of her career, leading to her leaving the label. In the same year, the World Music Awards recognized her years in the music business by awarding her the Legend Award. In 2006, she released her first gospel album, The Gospel According to Patti LaBelle on the Bungalo label, the album later peaking at number one on Billboard's gospel chart. LaBelle also released the book, Patti's Pearls, during this period. She returned to Def Jam in 2007 and released her second holiday album, Miss Patti's Christmas. In 2008, LaBelle briefly reunited with Nona Hendryx and Sarah Dash as Labelle on the group's first new album in more than 30 years, Back to Now.

 Later career (2010–present) 

On September 14, 2010, LaBelle made a return two decades after her last Broadway performance to star in the award-winning musical Fela! about Afrobeat legend Fela Anikulapo-Kuti. LaBelle replaced Tony Award-nominee Lillias White as Fela's mother, Funmilayo Ransome-Kuti, and performed with the production through the end of its run on January 2, 2011.

On May 23, 2011, LaBelle appeared on "Oprah's Farewell Spectacular, Part 1" the first show in a series of three shows constituting the finale of The Oprah Winfrey Show, singing "Over the Rainbow" with Josh Groban. LaBelle was honored with the Lifetime Achievement Award at the BET Awards on June 26, 2011. LaBelle and Aretha Franklin, among others, performed at the "Women of Soul: In Performance at the White House" concert hosted by President Barack Obama at the White House, recorded on March 6, 2014.

On June 10, 2014, LaBelle returned to Broadway as the cast and creative team of the Tony Award-nominated smash hit Broadway musical After Midnight, welcomed her as "Special Guest Star". In August 2014, it was announced that LaBelle would appear in a guest role on the upcoming fourth season of the FX horror anthology television series American Horror Story, subtitled Freak Show.

On February 24, 2015, LaBelle was announced as one of the celebrities who would compete on the 20th season of Dancing with the Stars. She partnered with professional dancer Artem Chigvintsev. The couple was eliminated on Week 6 and finished in eighth place. LaBelle has consistently toured the United States selling out shows in various markets. In 2012 and 2014 she appeared with Frankie Beverly & Maze on cross-country USA tours. In 2015 LaBelle made a guest appearance on Fox's television series Empire as herself.

She is scheduled to be a "key advisor" on the NBC series The Voice.

She returned to the VH1 Divas stage in 2016, headlining a holiday-themed concert alongside Chaka Khan, Vanessa Williams, and her goddaughter Mariah Carey. Her first jazz album, Bel Hommage, was released in 2017. In 2018 she began appearing in recurring roles on the television series Daytime Divas, Greenleaf and Star.

On July 2, 2019, LaBelle was honored in Philadelphia with her very own street name Patti LaBelle Way between Locust and Spruce Street. On November 20 of the same year, LaBelle was revealed to have competed on the second season of The Masked Singer as "Flower". LaBelle continued her acting career with roles alongside Cedric the Entertainer on The Neighborhood and Dulé Hill on The Wonder Years.

On December 10, 2022, Labelle's Christmas concert in Milwaukee, Wisconsin was disrupted when a bomb threat resulted in evacuation of the venue.

 Personal life 
LaBelle dropped out of Philadelphia's John Bartram High School just a semester before graduating in 1962. LaBelle returned to the school in her mid-thirties and later earned her diploma.

LaBelle wrote that she was sexually assaulted by Jackie Wilson while at the Brevoort Theatre at Brooklyn in the 1960s. Around 1964, LaBelle was engaged to Otis Williams, founding member of The Temptations. The engagement lasted a year before Patti broke it off after fearing Williams would force her to move to Detroit and retire from the road.

On July 23, 1969, LaBelle married a longtime friend, Armstead Edwards, who was a schoolteacher. After LaBelle started her solo career, Edwards became her manager, a position he would remain in until 2000. That year, LaBelle announced that she and Edwards had legally separated, with their divorce finalized in 2003. They have a son, Zuri Kye Edwards (born July 17, 1973), who is now her manager. Following Zuri's birth, LaBelle suffered from postpartum depression for a year and said singer-songwriter Laura Nyro helped to take care of Zuri while LaBelle recovered. Through Zuri (whose name means "good" in Swahili), LaBelle is a grandmother of two girls and one boy.

Members of LaBelle's family died at young ages. Her mother Bertha died in October 1978 from diabetes at the age of 62. Her father, Henry Holte Jr., died of complications from emphysema and Alzheimer's disease in October 1989 at the age of 70.

All three of LaBelle's sisters died young. Eldest sister Vivian Hogan Rogers died of lung cancer in October 1975 at the age of 43. Seven years later, in October 1982, her elder sister Barbara Holte Purifoy died from complications of colon cancer at the age of 40. In July 1989, three months before her father's death, LaBelle lost her youngest sister, Jacqueline "Jackie" Holte-Padgett, to brain cancer at the age of 43. A day after the singer buried Padgett, an emotionally-wrecked LaBelle shot the music video to "If You Asked Me To" where she was seen crying in various shots; the video was shot on what would have been Padgett's 44th birthday. The singer dedicated her 1991 Burnin' album, and her famous rendition of the song "Wind Beneath My Wings" during her concert tour in 1991–92 to Padgett.

LaBelle said because of her sisters and parents dying "before their time", she wrote in her autobiography that she feared she would not make it to 50. Once she reached that age, however, the singer said she felt her life "had just begun". A year later, LaBelle was diagnosed as having diabetes and later became a spokesperson for several organizations dedicated in fighting the disease.

She has a home in the Philadelphia suburb of Wynnewood and also has condos in Los Angeles and in Eleuthera, the Bahamas.

LaBelle is an honorary member of the Alpha Kappa Alpha sorority.

 Civil suits 
In 2010, LaBelle went into a rage that resulted in her verbally and physically attacking a mother and her 18 month old daughter.  The singer threw water, yelled obscenities, and attempted to assault the mother during a 10-minute tirade in the lobby of the Trump Place Apartments in Manhattan, NY.  LaBelle agreed to a settlement of $100,000 and attempted to get her son's deposition, where he lied that no altercation took place, destroyed following the settlement.  The family donated the award to a charity.

In June 2011, a West Point cadet filed a civil suit against LaBelle after he was allegedly assaulted by her bodyguards at George Bush Intercontinental Airport in Houston, Texas. LaBelle and her entourage were on their way to a gig in Louisiana when Richard King, a 23-year-old cadet on spring break, was waiting to be picked up in the ride-share area.  King alleged that Labelle's entourage attacked him, causing a concussion, Labelle’s entourage stated that he had provoked the attack. Video evidence showed he was on a cell phone prior to the attack and did not engage any of the members of Labelle's group until after they assaulted him.  King was suspended from the U.S. Military Academy. He sued LaBelle and Holmes for assault, seeking $1 million in civil court. LaBelle filed a counter-suit. Efrem Holmes, Labelle's bodyguard, was acquitted of misdemeanor assault on November 12, 2013, stemming from the incident.

 Pop culture 
Patti LaBelle has been described as "the greatest gay icon of all time and a prime example of the intersection of the LGBT community and black female artists".  In a 2017 interview, she said: "when I think about it, the gay fans are some of the reason – one big reason – I'm still standing, 'cause they loved me when other people tried not to. Everybody always says, "What makes gay men like you?" "I have no clue," I say. I still don't. But I know that love has lifted me up for many, many years."

LaBelle made some headlines in late 2015 when a vlogger known as James Wright (No Chanel) spoke enthusiastically on YouTube of her brand of sweet potato pies. The video quickly went viral and for a time, one pie sold every second at Walmart, selling out at stores across the country. She has appeared in two Walmart commercials also an Old Spice commercial.

LaBelle is the primary character on the popular web parody Got 2B Real.

Discography

Studio albums
Patti LaBelle (1977)
Tasty (1978)
It's Alright with Me (1979)
Released (1980)
The Spirit's in It (1981)
I'm in Love Again (1983)
Patti (1985)
Winner in You (1986)
Be Yourself (1989)
This Christmas (1990)
Burnin' (1991)
Gems (1994)
Flame (1997)
When a Woman Loves (2000)
Timeless Journey (2004)
Classic Moments (2005)
The Gospel According to Patti LaBelle (2006)
Miss Patti's Christmas (2007)
Bel Hommage (2017)

 Awards and nominations Honorary Doctorates'
 Berklee College of Music (1996)
 Temple University (2010)

Emmy Awards

Grammy Awards

Image Awards

Lifetime achievement awards

Others

Filmography

Film

Television

See also 
List of number-one dance hits (United States)
List of artists who reached number one on the US Dance chart

Notes

References

Sources

Further reading

External links 

Image of Stevie Wonder and Patti LaBelle performing at the Shrine Auditorium, 1978. Los Angeles Times Photographic Archive (Collection 1429). UCLA Library Special Collections, Charles E. Young Research Library, University of California, Los Angeles.

1944 births
Actresses from Pennsylvania
African-American actresses
African-American women singer-songwriters
American dance musicians
American disco singers
American film actresses
American musical theatre actresses
American rhythm and blues singer-songwriters
American sopranos
American soul singers
Ballad musicians
Baptists from Pennsylvania
Def Jam Recordings artists
Epic Records artists
Grammy Award winners
HIV/AIDS activists
John Bartram High School alumni
Labelle members
Living people
MCA Records artists
Musicians from Philadelphia
Philadelphia International Records artists
Singer-songwriters from Pennsylvania
World Music Awards winners
20th-century African-American women singers
21st-century African-American women singers
African American adoptees
American gospel singers
American women pop singers